The Halos & Horns Tour in 2002 was Dolly Parton's first major concert tour in 10 years and was to promote the release of her album Halos & Horns (2002). The tour started in the United States, moved to Ireland and England, before returning to the U.S. to finish.

Background
In the early 1990s Parton had stopped the grueling tour schedule that she had worked for most of her career; she was tired of it and did not see fit to keep a band on payroll. She continued to do casino shows in Atlantic City, New Jersey, and Las Vegas, and she also performed (usually annually) themed concerts at her Dollywood theme park.

With the resurgence of sorts of her career with the release of the album The Grass Is Blue (1999), Parton toyed with the idea of mounting a tour to promote the album. Scheduling conflicts with the many talented, and booked, musicians who played on the album prohibited the tour and the subsequent one which would have promoted the album Little Sparrow (2001). Parton did do some promotional concerts for the albums. She also appeared at the MerleFest at Wilkes Community College in Wilkesboro, North Carolina, on April 28, 2001, and performed a set list that comprised songs from the two albums as well as her greatest hits.

During Dollywood's opening weekend in April 2002, it was announced that Parton would release a new album, Halos & Horns, and would launch her first tour in a decade. The tour was promoted and produced by House of Blues. The venues were mainly club settings and seated somewhere between 1,000 and 2,500. Subsequently, every date on the tour sold out. Most reviews praised Parton and her recent bluegrass/folk releases.

Parton stated in interviews to promote the album and tour that the shows she would be performing would be very simple. There was no glitz or lights or video monitors that she had employed with her earlier tours in the late 1980s and early 1990s. Most of the songs that made up the set list were in the country/bluegrass/folk vein, although Parton did include her biggest pop hits in an a cappella medley. "9 to 5" was treated to a very stripped down, bluegrass treatment.

Set list
The following set list is representative of the December 12 and 13 shows at the Celebrity Theatre at Dollywood. It is not representative of all concerts for the duration of the tour.

"Orange Blossom Special"
"Train Train"
"The Grass Is Blue"
"Mountain Angel"
"Shine"
"Little Sparrow"
"Rocky Top"
"My Tennessee Mountain Home"
"Coat of Many Colors"
"Smoky Mountain Memories"
"Applejack"
"Marry Me"
"Halos and Horns"
"I'm Gone"
"Dagger Through the Heart"
"If"
"After the Gold Rush"
"9 to 5"
"Jolene"
Acapella Medley: "Islands in the Stream" / "Here You Come Again" / "Why'd You Come in Here Lookin' Like That" / "Two Doors Down"
"We Irish"
Stairway to Heaven"
"I Will Always Love You"

Notes
"Color Me America", "Calm on the Water", "Try", "Down from Dover", "I Don't Wanna Throw Rice", "He's a Go Getter", and "I'll Oilwells Love You" were performed on select dates.

Tour dates

External links
Parton's Official Website

References

 Dollymania page on tour press release
 Village Voice review

Dolly Parton concert tours
2002 concert tours